Upward Spiral is a term used by Paul Kennedy in his book The Rise and Fall of Great Powers to describe the continually rising cost of military equipment relative to civilian manufactured goods. According to Kennedy there is an upward spiral at work in "all areas" of military production which is "becoming increasingly divergent from the commercial". The desire for state-of-the-art weaponry is meant to be pushing up the cost.

Theory
Writing in the late 1980s he said it was reasonable to assume that the next few decades would witness "the spiralling cost of the arms race, which is fuelled by the sheer expensiveness of newer weapons systems as well as by international rivalries." Quoting the comment of Peter Mathias that "One of the few constancies in history... is that the scale of commitment on military spending has always risen" Kennedy argues that this has become more important with time. According to Kennedy, "if that was true for the wars and arms races of the eighteenth century, when weapons technology changed only slowly, it is much truer of the present century [20th], when each new generation of aircraft, warships and tanks is vastly more expensive than preceding ones, even when allowance is made for inflation." Kennedy uses several examples. While a pre-1914 battleship cost the British Admiralty 2.5 million pounds ( Taking inflation into account this would be approximately 56 million pounds in 1980 terms), by the 1980s 120 million pounds was needed to buy a replacement frigate. Another is that of the American B-2 Spirit Stealth bomber whose cost rose into the 1990s.

Possible reasons
Various possible reasons exist why military technology continues to rise in price. As military technologies are seldom if ever shared, each generation of technology requires each nation or group of nations to undertake long-term research programs independent of each other with no concrete knowledge of the weapons systems they will be expected to compete against, but with the knowledge that completing a project before competing nations will provide a considerable advantage, while falling behind could be disastrous. These factors combine to encourage very extensive research spending, even if results are never delivered.

Secondly, military technologies are expected to remain technologically competitive over its service life which can be longer than a decade. To achieve 'cutting-edge' technology at time of delivery (and thus technology that will still be relevant in some years time), the advances used are rarely mature technologies; this necessitates the use of custom-machined parts instead of off-the-shelf solutions. Within a few years, formerly cutting-edge solutions mature to become readily available at greatly reduced cost, but by this stage a system has already been delivered, and the next iteration of a system seeks to be more advanced than the currently available off-the-shelf systems.

Thirdly, there are numerous technologies that are extremely expensive to develop and deploy, but once they are deployed by all nations, the relative value of the technology is significantly lowered. Advancements are extremely valuable when only one nation or power block possesses them, but once all nations have access to similar technologies, there is a requirement to deploy weapons that can defeat the original advance. This leaves the parties in much the same position as they were initially, while the cost of the platform will nevertheless have increased. This forms a cyclical arms race where unit prices continue to increase but the balance of power remains the same. Reactive tank armor resulted in a number of different advanced anti-tank munition (top attack, tandem charge, depleted uranium penetrators) with the end result that all new tanks are required to have both advanced armor and advanced munitions, but relative to each other are no more powerful.

Finally, many advancements increase the cost of a system but reduce the risk to platform and human lives. This increases costs in monetary terms, but provides very significant value that is not seen by observers. Technologies like stealth aircraft have been extremely expensive to develop and they only deploy the same munitions as conventional aircraft, which to observers can imply that the system cost is wasted. However, as they allow for missions to be successfully flown with far reduced risk to the aircraft, the net result can be better overall value even at higher cost.

See also
Pre-paid supplies

Notes

References
Paul Kennedy, The Rise and Fall of Great Powers (London: Fontana, 1989).
Peter Mathias, First Industrial Nation: An Economic History of Britain 1700-1914 (London, 1969).

Economic warfare
Military doctrines
Military economics
Military industry
Military logistics